Marfrig is the second largest Brazilian food processing company, after JBS. The company is headquartered in São Paulo. The company has an operational base in 22 countries, exporting to over 100, and is the second-largest beef producer in the world.

Implication in deforestation 

Marfrig Global Foods's beef exports has repeatedly implicated in illegal deforestation, as well as indigenous land rights violations and slave labour according to the environmental watchdog Forests and Finance. It has previously been identified as having a problematic beef supply chain fuelling the deforestation of the Amazon forest. The deforestation free supply chain watchdog Forest 500 further identified Marfrig's commitments as being insufficient, with a commitment strength of 9/20 In February 2022, IDB Invest, the private-sector arm of the Inter-American Development Bank shelved a US$200 million loan to Marfrig Global Foods over the group's deforestation impact.

Attention from institutional investors due to Amazon rainforest destruction 
On 21. December 2021 the Government Pension Fund of Norway placed Marfrig under observation "due to risk that the company contributes to serious environmental damage".

Group activities 

Marfrig has about 90,000 employees and has the following structure of units: 33 units of cattle industry (24 in Brazil, five in Argentina, and four in Uruguay), 21 industrial units of chickens (14 in Brazil, four in Europe, and three in the United States), 48 plants for industrial goods and processed (16 in Brazil, five in Argentina, three in Uruguay, eight in the US, one in China, one in Thailand, one in Malaysia, one in South Korea, one in Australia, and 11 in Europe), four industrial pig units in Brazil, two industrial units of turkeys (one in Brazil and one in Europe), five plants of lamb (one in Brazil, three in Uruguay and one in Chile), 27 own factories of feed for chickens, turkeys, and pigs (21 in Brazil, three in Europe and three in the U.S.) and two trading companies (Chile and the United Kingdom), 14 industries and commercial offices for leather (one in Brazil, four in Uruguay, one in China, one in Germany, two in the U.S., one in Argentina, one in Mexico, and three in South Africa). The daily capacity is 31,200 head of cattle, 10,400 pigs, 10,400 sheep, 350,000 turkeys, and 3.7 million chickens.

In addition, the company has an installed capacity around 126,000 tons of processed products, and more than 178,500 pieces of leather processed per month. In June 2010, it announced the acquisition of Keystone Foods, a supplier of processed meats for the restaurant chain McDonald's and other companies. In 2018, Marfrig sold Keystone to Tyson Foods.

Sponsorship activities 

The company was a sponsor of the 2010 and 2014 FIFA World Cups, the latter held in Marfrig's home country of Brazil.

See also

Impact of the 2019–20 coronavirus pandemic on the meat industry in the United States

References

External links

Meat companies of Brazil
Companies listed on B3 (stock exchange)
Manufacturing companies based in São Paulo
Brazilian brands